Dame Madeline Dorothy Brock  (18 November 1886 – 31 December 1969) was an English educationist. She served as Headmistress of the Mary Datchelor Girls' School, Camberwell, London from 1918 to 1950. She oversaw the evacuation of the school during the Second World War.

Life
Brock was born in Islington in 1886. She was the youngest of three children. While she was a young child her family moved to Bromley where she attended Bromley High School. She went on to read classics at Girton College, Cambridge where her talent at piano was exploited. She began teaching at the King Edward VI High School for Girls in Birmingham.

Dr. Brock was appointed to be the head of the Mary Datchelor school in 1918 even though she was the youngest candidate. She took over from the founding head, Caroline Rigg.

In 1919, Brock was appointed a member of the Prime Minister's Committee on Classics and from 1927–29, she was chairman of the Committee of the Association of Headmistresses. She became vice-president of the Classical Association in 1930, and a member of the Lancet Commission on Nursing the following year.  From 1931 to 1940, Dame Dorothy was a member of the Consultative Committee of the Board of Education.  From 1933-35, she was President of the Association of Headmistresses. During World War II, Brock led the evacuation of Mary Datchelor Girls School to Ashford then latterly to Llanelli.  She published a pamphlet called "An Unusual Happening" telling the story of the evacuation years. She was a much-loved and caring headmistress. She was succeeded as head in 1950 by Rachel N Pearse. From 1951 to 1968, Brock was a director of the University of London Press.

Awards and honours
Brock was recognised for her services to education with an OBE in 1929, and was named a Dame Commander of the Order of the British Empire in the New Year Honours, 1947.

References

External links
Informaworld
archived papers at janus.lib.cam.ac.uk

1886 births
1969 deaths
Heads of schools in London
Dames Commander of the Order of the British Empire
People from Camberwell
English educational theorists
Women heads of schools in the United Kingdom
Steamboat ladies
Alumni of Girton College, Cambridge